Pulau Reni is a small Indonesian island located in the Ayu Archipelago  above the northern tip of the Waigeo Islands.

Pulau Reni is part of the Raja Ampat regency of the Southwest Papua geographical and administrative region of Indonesia.

The island is surrounded by two large reefs.

Pulau Ayu and Pulau Kanobe are two other small inhabited islands south-west and south of Pulau Reni.

Access to the island is limited to small boats due to the reefs and the small size of the island.

World War II
Pulau Reni and all the islands in the Ayu Archipelago were occupied by the Japanese Empire during World War II from 1942 until the end of the war in 1945.

External links

 Palau Reni Information
 Detailed Map

Raja Ampat Islands